Zdeněk “Bobby” Zlámal (born 5 November 1985) is a Czech former professional footballer who played as a goalkeeper. He has previously played for Spartak Hulín, Hanácká Slavia Kroměříž, Sparta Prague, Tescoma Zlín, Slovan Liberec, Udinese, Cádiz CF, Slavia Prague, Bari, Sigma Olomouc, Bohemians, Alanyaspor, Fastav Zlín, Heart of Midlothian, St Mirren and St Johnstone. Zlámal is a Czech Republic international, having been capped once in 2009.

Club career

Early career
Zlámal began his career with Spartak Hulín at the age of 5. He first started as a goalkeeper for Spartak Hulín when he was 16, he debuted on 14 July 2002 in the Czech Cup game against FC Morkovice. In the 82nd minute he remained unconscious after a collision with an opponent, and was sent to the local hospital. For the 2004–05 season, Zlámal moved to the Czech second division, to play for Hanácká Slavia Kroměříž, where he was immediately a starting player.

After 36 starts in the Czech second division Zlámal signed with a team from Czech First League, FC Slovan Liberec. Despite his signing of the contract with Slovan Liberec, Zlámal agreed on a contract with Czech champion Sparta Prague. The young goalkeeper had to pay a fine for breaking his contract, but in January 2006 Zlámal was finally in Prague ready to play for Sparta. Unfortunately, number one goalkeeper at Sparta Prague was experienced Jaromír Blažek that time. Zlámal played just a couple of matches for the reserve team.

For the 2006–07 season, Zlámal was sent to FC Tescoma Zlín. The clubs agreed on a loan lasting one year. There Zlámal regularly started as the goalkeeper. In the summer of 2007, after the transfer of Blažek to Bundesliga team 1. FC Nürnberg, Zlámal was sent back to Sparta Prague, although in August, just one month later, he was sold on to Slovan Liberec.

Udinese and loans
In August 2009, Zlámal signed a five-year contract with Italian club side Udinese Calcio. Zlámal was sent on a loan to Cádiz immediately after his transfer to Italy.

In September 2010, Zlámal moved on loan to Slavia Prague until the end of the 2010–11 season. In July 2011, Zlámal returned to Italy after two years out on loan, reportedly for a domestic loan to Bari.

Bari
On 13 July 2011, he was called-up to Bari's pre-season camp and on 15 July Udinese confirmed Zlámal moved to Bari in co-ownership deal, which Fernando Forestieri also moved from the northern side to the south.

Heart of Midlothian
Zlámal signed a three-year contract with Scottish Premiership club Heart of Midlothian in May 2018.

On 12 September 2020, Zlámal signed for Scottish Premiership club St. Mirren on a seven-day emergency loan. He played in three matches during that week, as cover for two goalkeepers who had tested positive for COVID-19.

In May 2021, Zlámal signed for St Johnstone on an emergency loan, and was an unused substitute in the Scottish Cup semi-final on 8 May. Despite not being selected to start or sit on the bench for the final, Zlámal was part of the squad when the Saints won the Scottish Cup.

Zlámal was released from Hearts in May 2021 upon the expiry of his contract. In September 2021, Zlámal announced his retirement from football in an Instagram post.

International career
Zlámal was a member of the Czech Republic U-21 team between 2006 and 2007. He was also part of the squad during the 2007 UEFA European Under-21 Football Championship.

Zlámal was nominated by the former Czech Republic national team coach František Straka for the international friendly match against Malta in May 2009.

Honours 
SK Sigma Olomouc
 Czech Cup: 2011–12
 Czech Supercup: 2012

St Johnstone
 Scottish Cup: 2020–21

References

External links
 
 
 
 Profile on Sparta.cz 
 Zdeněk Zlámal profile at cadistas1910.com 

1985 births
Living people
Sportspeople from Přerov
Czech footballers
Association football goalkeepers
Czech Republic international footballers
Czech Republic under-21 international footballers
Czech First League players
Segunda División players
Süper Lig players
Scottish Professional Football League players
FC Fastav Zlín players
FC Slovan Liberec players
SK Slavia Prague players
SK Sigma Olomouc players
Udinese Calcio players
S.S.C. Bari players
Cádiz CF players
Bohemians 1905 players
Alanyaspor footballers
Heart of Midlothian F.C. players
St Mirren F.C. players
St Johnstone F.C. players
Czech expatriate footballers
Czech expatriate sportspeople in Italy
Expatriate footballers in Italy
Czech expatriate sportspeople in Spain
Expatriate footballers in Spain
Czech expatriate sportspeople in Turkey
Expatriate footballers in Turkey
Czech expatriate sportspeople in Scotland
Expatriate footballers in Scotland